List of colleges and schools in Chengannur:

Colleges
 College of Engineering Chengannur
 Mount Zion Institute of Science & Technology, Kozhuvalloor
 St. Thomas College of Engineering And Technology, Kozhuvalloor
 Christian College, Chengannur 
 Sree Narayana College, Ala, Chengannur
 Sree Ayyappa College, Eramallikkara, Chengannur
 Providence College of Engineering, Chengannur
 College of applied science, Perissery, Chengannur

Schools

 Mathews Mar Athanasius Residential School, Chengannur
 A.M.M Higher Secondary School, Edayaranmula
 St. Gregorios School Senior Secondary School, Chengannur
 High School Kallissery
 Metropolitan Higher Secondary School Puthencavu
 Ebenezer EM High School, Kallissery
 Chinmaya Vidyalaya, Chengannur
 Government Boys School
 Government Girls School
 St Anne's G.H School, Nursery, U.P, Highschool, Higher secondary
 Thalapanagad LP School (also known as Madathilparampil School)
JBS MANGALAM
 St. George Public School Kozhuvalloor
 St Mary's Residential Mulakkuzha
 Devaswom Board High School, Cheriyanad
 Devaswom Board Higher Secondary School, Cheriyanad
 Srivijayeshwari High School, Cheriyanad
 St Bursouma's Public School & Junior College, Ayranikudy, Pandalam
 St Judes UP School, Venmoney
 Government High School, Puliyoor
 Snehagiri UP School, Puliyoor
 Government Primary School, Thonakadu
 Mar Philexinos U P School, Puthencavu
 G M P Kindergarten School, Puthencavu
 C M S U P School, Kodukulanji
 John Memorial High School, Kodukulanji
 Christ Church Vidyapeeth, Kodukulanji
 Raja Rajeswari Central School kodukulanji
 Mar Pilexinos L P School, Neervilakom
 N S S High School, Edanadu
 Government U.P.S Perissery
 GHS Thiruvavandoor
 Sree Hariharasutha Vilasom (S.H.V) High School, Karakkad
 Government L.P School, Karakkad
 St Joseph English medium school, Cheriyanad (I.C.S.E.)
 L P School Piralassery (ESTD 1889)
 E.A.L.P School Angadical
 SNDP LP School, Kozhuvalloor
 Government High School, Mulakuzha
 St.Mary's School ,Kallisery
 Government Higher Secondary School, Angadical South
 Swami Vivekananda High School Pandanad (SVHS)
 St Ignatious Cathedral English Medium School, Mundancavu
 Sree Vijayswary High School, Cheriyanad
SREE BHUVANESWARI HIGHER SECONDARY SCHOOL,MANNAR 
Scrv TTI angadical chengannur

Schools in Alappuzha district
Lists of universities and colleges in Kerala